Sarah Garner (born May 21, 1971) is an American rower and Olympic bronze medalist.

Life and education
Garner hails from Madison, Wisconsin. She graduated from the University of Pennsylvania in 1994.

Achievements
In 1997, Garner won the gold medal in women's single lightweight sculls at World Rowing Championships and was awarded USRowing's female Athlete of the Year.

She won a bronze medal at the 2000 Olympics in woman's lightweight double sculls with teammate Christine Collins with a time of 7:06.37.

References

American female rowers
Rowers at the 2000 Summer Olympics
Living people
1971 births
World Rowing Championships medalists for the United States
Medalists at the 2000 Summer Olympics
Olympic bronze medalists for the United States in rowing
21st-century American women